Qatar Olympic Committee (IOC code: QAT) is the National Olympic Committee representing Qatar.

History
The QOC was formed in 1979 and was granted full recognition by the International Olympic Committee in 1980. QOC's main goal is to bring world-class sports events to Qatar, ensure sporting success and encourage people to participate in sports at all levels. The QOC developed many programs, events and initiatives, such as National Sports Day, the Qatar Olympic Academy, the Qatar Women’s Sports Committee, the Schools Olympic Program, and the Qatar Athlete Development Pathway. Their vision is to become a leading nation in bringing the world together through the development of sport.  They want to support and develop performance in sports within the context of olympic spirit and spread physical activities throughout Qatar. Joaan bin Hamad bin Khalifa Al Thani, the fifth son of the father Emir, became the QOC president in May 2015. During the Asian Games in Doha 2006, he was the ambassador of the Torch relay. In 2015, he was also the president of the Organizing Committee of the 24th Men's Handball World Championship.

Female competitors
Until the 2012 Summer Olympics in London, Qatar was one of three counties that had never had a female competitor at the Olympic games.  Qatar eventually sent four women, in swimming (Nada Arkaji), athletics (Noor Hussain Al-Malki), table tennis (Aya Majdi) and shooting (Bahiya Al-Hamad). Bahiya al-Hamad was also set to carry the Qatari flag at the opening ceremony, in what she said was a "truly historic moment".

Even though they had a late participation in the Olympic Games, Qatari female athletes have participated in regional and local competitions prior to that. With their first appearance in major games in Busan 2002 Asian Games.

See also 
 Qatar at the Olympics
Asma Al Thani

References

External links 
 Official website

Qatar
Oly
Qatar at the Olympics
1979 establishments in Qatar
Sports organizations established in 1979